Winter Valley is a suburb of Ballarat, Victoria, Australia. It is named after John Winter. Many residents opposed the previous suggestion to name the suburb after Aboriginal elder Mullawallah.

References

Suburbs of Ballarat